Vigon (born Mohsine Abdelghafour on 13 July 1945) is a Moroccan singer, songwriter, record producer, dancer and bandleader. He had created a great buzz in 2011 singing James Brown's "I Feel Good" in season 1 of the French The Voice: la plus belle voix with (season 1) at the age of 67 being the most aged of the show's contestants.

References

External links
Official website

20th-century Moroccan male singers
1945 births
People from Rabat
Living people
21st-century Moroccan male singers